A signoria  was the governing authority in many of the Italian city states during the Medieval and Renaissance periods.
The word signoria comes from signore , or "lord"; an abstract noun meaning (roughly) "government; governing authority; de facto sovereignty; lordship"; plural: signorie.

Signoria versus the commune

In Italian history the rise of the signoria is a phase often associated with the decline of the medieval commune system of government and the rise of the dynastic state. In this context the word signoria (here to be understood as "lordly power") is used in opposition to the institution of the commune or city republic.

Contemporary observers and modern historians see the rise of the signoria  as a reaction to the failure of the communi to maintain law-and-order and suppress party strife and civil discord. In the anarchic conditions that often prevailed in medieval Italian city-states, people looked to strong men to restore order and disarm the feuding elites.

In times of anarchy or crisis, cities sometimes offered the signoria to individuals perceived as strong enough to save the state. For example, the Tuscan state of Pisa offered the signoria to Charles VIII of France in the hope that he would protect the independence of Pisa from its long term enemy Florence. Similarly, Siena offered the signoria to Cesare Borgia.

Types

The composition and specific functions of the signoria varied from city to city. In some states (such as Verona under the Della Scala family or Florence in the days of Cosimo de Medici and Lorenzo the Magnificent), the polity was what we would term today a one-party state in which the dominant party had vested the signoria of the state in a single family or dynasty.

In Florence, the arrangement was unofficial, as it was not constitutionally formalized before the Medici were expelled from the city in 1494.

In other states (such as the Visconti of Milan}, the dynasty's right to the signoria was a formally recognized part of the commune's constitution, which had been "ratified" by the people and recognized by the pope or the Holy Roman Empire.

The term is also used to refer to certain small feudal holdings in Sicily similar to manorial lordships and, like them, were established in Norman times. With the abolition of feudalism in Sicily in 1812, some of the holdings became baronies. More often, a barony consisted of several signorie.

Use of word

In a few states, the word was sometimes used to refer to the constitutional government of a republic rather than the power exercised by an individual monarch or noble family.

For example, the word was sometimes used in Renaissance times to refer to the government of the Republics of Florence or of Venice, as in Shakespeare's Othello in which Othello says:

"Let him do his spite:
My services which I have done the signiory
Shall out-tongue his complaints"
 - (Act one, scene one)

Occasionally, the word referred to specific organs or functions of the state. The signoria in the Republic of Florence was the highest executive organ, and the signoria of the Republic of Venice was mainly a judicial body.

List of signorie

See also
 Seignory
 Signoria of Florence
 Signoria of Venice
 Forni della Signoria

References

Italian Renaissance